Acts Retirement-Life Communities (Acts), based out of Fort Washington, Pennsylvania, is the third largest not-for-profit owner, operator and developer of continuing care retirement communities (CCRCs) in the United States. Acts Life Care® communities provide independent living residences for people age 62 and above, with access to assisted living and skilled nursing care services, usually on the same campus.

History
Acts began in the early 1970s, when a suburban Philadelphia pastor and members of the Church of the Open Door, a nondenominational church, sought a new and better way of living for the retired church members. Fulfilling instruction of the Scriptures, their idea was to provide a fulfilling and meaningful independent living lifestyle with a quality skilled health care environment that would be available if ever needed. Using their own resources, this group built the first part of what today is known as Fort Washington Estates, which opened in 1972.

As of 2019, Acts provides housing and services to more than 10,000 seniors through its family of 26 senior living communities in nine states, and employs approximately 8,000 people.

Organization
Acts is divided into four regions:
 Northeast - includes Pennsylvania with eight campuses
 Mid-Atlantic - includes Delaware, New Jersey, and Maryland with eight campuses
 Mid-South - includes Alabama, Georgia, North and South Carolina with five campuses
 Southeast - includes Florida and Alabama with five campuses

Locations

Alabama
 Magnolia Trace, Huntsville
 Westminster Village, Spanish Fort

Delaware
 Country House, Greenville
 Manor House, Seaford
 Cokesbury Village, Hockessin

Florida
 Azalea Trace, Pensacola
 Edgewater Pointe Estates, Boca Raton
 Indian River Estates, Vero Beach
 St. Andrews Estates, Boca Raton

Georgia
 Lanier Village Estates, Gainesville

Maryland
 Heron Point, Chestertown
 Bayleigh Chase, Easton
 Buckingham's Choice, Adamstown
 Fairhaven, Sykesville

New Jersey
The Evergreens, Moorestown

North Carolina
 Matthews Glen, Matthews
 Tryon Estates, Columbus

South Carolina
 Park Pointe Village, Rock Hill

Pennsylvania
 Brittany Pointe Estates, Lansdale
 Fort Washington Estates, Fort Washington
 Granite Farms Estates, Media
 Gwynedd Estates, Ambler
 Lima Estates, Media
 Normandy Farms Estates, Blue Bell
 Southampton Estates, Southampton
 Spring House Estates, Lower Gwynedd

References

External links

Definition of a Skilled Nursing Facility
Fitch Rates ACTS Retirement-Life Communities Obligated Group (PA) Ser 2012 Revs 'A-'; Outlook Stable

Health care companies based in Pennsylvania
Health care companies established in 1979
1979 establishments in Pennsylvania